Communist Action was a Marxist organisation in Spain founded in exile in 1964, during the Francoist State. The organisation produced a newspaper entitled Acción Comunista. Among its members were Carlos Semprún and José Antonio Ubierna. In 1970 AC came in contact with workerist organizations like UHP and CRAS (Comunas Revolucionarias de Acción Socialista). In 1976 some of its members, especially in Catalonia, joined the POUM.

AC was legalized in Spain in 1977. In the first democratic elections AC participated in the Front for Workers' Unity, with the Revolutionary Communist League (LCR), the Organization of Communist Left (OIC) and the POUM. After an unsuccessful process of merger with the POUM, AC held a congress of self-dissolution in 1978.

Ideology
Communist Action was influenced by the English-speaking New Left, specially by the American Studies on the Left and the British New Left Review.

AC didn't practice democratic centralism and was influenced by Situationism, Council communism and Luxemburgism. Among the most relevant authors for AC there were: Clara Zetkin, Rosa Luxemburg, Otto Rühle, Andreu Nin, Alexandra Kollontai, Trotsky, Joaquim Maurín, Karl Korsch, Paul Mattick, Anton Pannekoek, Claude Lefort, Cornelius Castoriadis, Guy Debord, etc. AC was a rather eclectic party, that did not aspire to be the vanguard party of the working class, nor its "point of reference", but was a supporter of ideas like "workers' democracy" and "self-management socialism".

There were rigid criteria for the selection of aspiring militants and it was necessary to go through an initiation process to be able to belong to the association.

References

 Carrillo Linares, Antonio. Subversivos y malditos en la Universidad de Sevilla (1965-1977). Centro de Estudios Andaluces, Seville, 2008. pp. 244–246, 326-327, 419, etc.

Defunct communist parties in Spain
Anti-Francoism
Libertarian socialist parties
Left communist organizations